"I'm Happy Just to Dance with You" is a song written by John Lennon and Paul McCartney and recorded in 1964 by the English rock band the Beatles for the film soundtrack to A Hard Day's Night. Lead vocals are by George Harrison, whose performance in the film marked the first mass media depiction of Harrison singing lead.

Composition
The song was written specifically for George Harrison to sing at a time when he lacked the confidence to compose his own material. Years later, McCartney described it as a "formula song", and Lennon said, "I would never have sung it myself."

The song features a hectic style rhythm guitar in juxtaposition with Harrison's placid vocal. Its composers give it an unexpected choice of chord at the crux of its chorus, augmenting the B7th on "I'm happy just to dance with you". The song is also distinctive in that it begins not with a verse or chorus but with the last four bars of the bridge. According to musicologist Ian MacDonald, its guitar part derives its inspiration from the Rolling Stones' cover of Buddy Holly's song, Not Fade Away.

Cash Box described it as "a stomp-a-rhythmic delight."

Recording
The Beatles recorded "I'm Happy Just to Dance with You" on a Sunday, the first time they had used Abbey Road Studios on a day other than a normal work day. United Artists released the song on the album A Hard Day's Night on 26 June. It was also included on the album Something New, released by Capitol Records on 20 July. It hit #95 on the Billboard Top 100 chart on 1 August 1964, its only appearance on that chart. It is one of only two Lennon–McCartney songs sung by Harrison during the group's career, the other song being "Do You Want to Know a Secret".

The group also recorded a version for the BBC's From Us to You radio show. The session took place on 17 July 1964 at the BBC Paris Studio in London, and was first broadcast on 3 August that year. An instrumental piano-only version is heard in the A Hard Day's Night film, during rehearsals for a musical television broadcast.

Personnel
George Harrison – lead vocal, lead guitar
John Lennon – backing vocal, rhythm guitar
Paul McCartney – backing vocal, bass
Ringo Starr – drums, African drum
George Martin – producer
Norman Smith – engineer
Personnel per Ian MacDonald

Anne Murray cover

Anne Murray included a cover of "I'm Happy Just to Dance with You" on her 1980 album Somebody's Waiting. Murray had had some success in previous years covering other Beatles songs such as "You Won't See Me" and "Day Tripper." Unlike the Beatles' original, Murray's version of "I'm Happy Just to Dance with You" is an adult-contemporary ballad. Murray's version of the song was released as a single in mid-1980, reaching No. 64 on the Billboard Hot 100, No. 23 on the Billboard country chart, and No. 13 Adult Contemporary.

Chart performance
The Beatles

Anne Murray

Other cover versions
 The Cyrkle released a version of the song on their 1967 album, Neon.  
 Randy Bachman and Burton Cummings included a cover of the song on their 2007 album Jukebox. The Smithereens also released a cover on their 2008 album, B-Sides The Beatles.

Later uses
Tori Kelly sang the song as the character Millie Pede in Beat Bugs, an Australian-Canadian animated children's television series.

References
Notes

Bibliography

External links

 

1964 singles
1980 singles
The Beatles songs
Anne Murray songs
The Cyrkle songs
Capitol Records singles
Song recordings produced by George Martin
Songs written for films
Songs written by Lennon–McCartney
Songs published by Northern Songs
1964 songs
Parlophone singles
Songs about dancing